Karlgarin Reservoir is situated adjacent the wheatbelt town of Karlgarin, Western Australia.
The reservoir is filled from runoff from a bitumen catchment. The water caught in the reservoir was originally then pumped up to a high level tank for the town use. With the advent of the Great Southern scheme where water is sent through the wheatbelt from the Harris Dam the need to use the water is now not great and as such only used in emergencies.

External links
 Dam storage level website

Reservoirs in Western Australia